William Stetson Kennedy (October 5, 1916 – August 27, 2011) was an American author, folklorist and human rights activist. One of the pioneer folklore collectors during the first half of the 20th century, he is remembered for having infiltrated the Ku Klux Klan in the 1940s, exposing its secrets to authorities and the outside world. His actions led to the 1947 revocation by the state of Georgia of the Klan's national corporate charter. Kennedy wrote or co-wrote ten books.

Childhood and education
William Stetson Kennedy, commonly known as Stetson Kennedy, was born on October 5, 1916, in Jacksonville, Florida to Willye Stetson and George Wallace Kennedy. A descendant of signers of the Declaration of Independence, Kennedy came from a wealthy, aristocratic Southern family with relatives including  John Batterson Stetson, founder of the Stetson hat empire and namesake of Stetson University, and an uncle "Brady" who served as the head Klan official, or "Great Titan", of a congressional district.

At a young age, Kennedy began collecting Florida folklore material and wrote poetry about Florida nature. His views on race relations in the South were largely influenced by his family's black maid, known only as "Flo", whom Kennedy considered "almost like a mother". He recalled that during his childhood in the 1920s, local Klan members beat and raped Flo for "sassing whitefolks" after she questioned a white bus driver who had given her incorrect change. Recalling this incident later in life, Kennedy said, "At a very tender age, I became aware that grownups were lying about a whole lot more than Santa Claus", in reference to the Klan's claims of being Christian patriots.

Kennedy attended Jacksonville public schools and graduated from Robert E. Lee High School during the Great Depression. In 1935, he enrolled in University of Florida (UF), leaving in 1937 without receiving a degree. He also studied at the New School for Social Research in New York and at the Sorbonne in Paris, France.

Early writing and activism
In 1936, while studying at University of Florida, Kennedy collected boots and blankets for the Spanish Republic during the Spanish Civil War.

Kennedy has been called "one of the pioneer folklore collectors during the first half of the 20th century". In 1937, he left the University of Florida to join the Federal Writers' Project, the federally funded Works Progress Administration (WPA) initiative created under the New Deal to fund and support American writers during the Great Depression. As part of the Federal Writers' Project, the Library of Congress hired archivists to document the diversity of American culture by recording regional folksongs (e.g., children's songs, dance and gospel music) and oral histories in many languages and dialects. For five years, Kennedy collected Florida folklore, traveling throughout Florida alongside other notable figures such as Harlem Renaissance writer Zora Neale Hurston and folklorist Alan Lomax, among others. Kennedy had a large role in editing several volumes for the Federal Writers' Project, including The WPA Guide to Florida and A Guide to Key West of the WPA's famed American Guide Series, and The Florida Negro.

Kennedy's first book, Palmetto Country (1942), which was commissioned by Georgia writer Erskine Caldwell for his American Folkways Series, was based on unused material collected during Kennedy's time with the Federal Writers' Project. When it was published, Alan Lomax of the Library of Congress said, "I very much doubt that a better book about Florida folklife will ever be written".

In 1942, Kennedy began working for the CIO, a federation of labor unions for industrial workers. As an editorial director for the CIO's political action committee (PAC) in Atlanta, he wrote a series of monographs advocating against racist policies such as the poll tax, white primaries, and other restrictions that were routinely used throughout the South to disenfranchise minorities, primarily African Americans, and poor people from being able to exercise their right to vote.

Infiltration of the Ku Klux Klan
Kennedy was unable to enlist in the military to serve in World War II because of a bad back, so he decided to channel his patriotism towards combatting racial injustices in the Jim Crow South. He is best known for infiltrating the Georgia Ku Klux Klan and for exposing their secrets on the popular children's radio program The Adventures of Superman, thus trivializing their rituals. He also targeted the Columbians, an Atlanta-based neo-Nazi organization. Kennedy said, "There were an awful lot of evils abroad in the world at the time, as there still are, but I couldn't help but feel that racism was perhaps the most evil".

Working with the Georgia Bureau of Investigation, Kennedy joined the multiple Klan-affiliated organizations under the pseudonym John Perkins. He intended to gain evidence that could be used to prosecute its members. He obtained information about the Klan's "Invisible Empire" through his own participation and also through a high-ranking informant. As soon as he became aware of new details, he shared the Klan's secrets with police, prosecutors, journalists, and human rights organizations. In 1947, after a year of working undercover, he consented to testify in a trial against the leaders of the Columbians, Homer Loomis and Emory Burke, who were found guilty.

Kennedy claimed that in 1946, he provided information – including secret codewords and details of Klan rituals – to the writers of the Superman radio program, intending to strip away the Klan's mystique. There was a series of 16 episodes in which Superman took on the Klan. Kennedy claimed that the trivialization of the Klan's rituals and codewords likely had a negative impact on Klan recruiting and membership. This led Stephen J. Dubner and Steven Levitt to dub Kennedy "the greatest single contributor to the weakening of the Ku Klux Klan" in their 2005 book Freakonomics. In 2006, Dubner and Levitt cast doubt on their claim with correction that "the story of Stetson Kennedy was one long series of anecdotes — which, no matter how many times they were cited over the decades, were nearly all generated by the same self-interested source".

Critical assessments from his peers
In 1999, freelance historian Ben Green alleged that Kennedy falsified or misrepresented portions of The Klan Unmasked. During the 1990s, Green had enlisted Kennedy's help while researching a book about the still unsolved murders of Florida couple Harry and Harriette Moore, black Civil Rights activists who died of injuries from the bombing of their home on Christmas Eve 1951. Green's book about the Moores, Before His Time, was published in 1999. Green, whose book is generally disparaging of Kennedy, claimed to have examined Kennedy's archives at the Schomburg Center for Research in Black Culture in Harlem and Atlanta and he concluded that a number of interviews, portrayed in I Rode With The Ku Klux Klan as having been conducted undercover, had in fact been done openly, and that racist material amassed by Kennedy had also been openly obtained from mail subscriptions to the Klan and similar groups and not surreptitiously, as Kennedy implied. Most seriously, Green accused Kennedy of concealing the existence of a collaborator, referred to as "John Brown" (a pseudonym presumably chosen in honor of the 19th-century abolitionist John Brown). This pseudonymous collaborator, Green alleged, was in fact responsible for the most daring of Kennedy's undercover revelations.

Green also interviewed Georgia State Prosecutor Dan Duke, whom he reported as denying having worked with Kennedy as closely as the latter had claimed. "Duke agreed that Kennedy 'got inside of some [Klan] meetings' but openly disputed Kennedy's dramatized account of their relationship. "'None of that happened,' [Duke] told Green", according to Freakonomics authors Stephen J. Dubner and Steven D. Levitt in their New York Times Magazine column of January 8, 2006. On the other hand, Peggy Bulger—the then-head of the American Folklife Center of the Library of Congress, who wrote her Ph.D. dissertation on Kennedy and interviewed him extensively—stated that when she interviewed Duke, "Duke laughed about the way The Klan Unmasked was written. But he added that Kennedy 'didn't do it all, but he did plenty.'" In the same column, Levitt and Dubner also quote Jim Clark, a professor at the University of Central Florida and co-author of a PBS television documentary based on Green's book, as saying that "[Kennedy] built a national reputation on many things that didn't happen". Jim Clark and Ben Green collaborated on the script of Freedom Never Dies: The Story of Harry T. Moore, based on Green's book and partially funded by the Freedom Forum. In a letter to Kennedy dated July 27, 1946, Georgia Governor Ellis Arnall wrote: 'You have my permission to quote me as making the following observation: Documentary evidence uncovered by Stetson Kennedy has facilitated Georgia's prosecution of the Ku Klux Klan.'"

Dubner and Levitt had included a favorable summary of Kennedy's anti-Klan activities with special emphasis on the events recounted in I Rode with the Ku Klux Klan in the 2005 edition of their bestselling book. In the revised 2006 edition, after being contacted by Green, they retracted their earlier admiration, claiming that they had been "hoodwinked". The allegations in their retraction were swiftly repeated by the business journal Forbes in a review of the revised edition of Freakonomics: "It turns out that Kennedy doesn't quite live up to his own legend. In fact, he had exaggerated his story for decades and credited himself with actions taken by other people".

Green's insinuations are contested by scholars, who emphasize that Kennedy never concealed that he had protected his colleagues' identities and maintain that Green either misread or did not really read the material at the Schomburg Center. Bulger maintains that Kennedy was always candid with her and others about his combination of two narratives into one in I Rode With the Ku Klux Klan: "His purpose was to expose the Klan to a broad reading audience and use their folklore against them, which he did". In a letter to the editor of The New York Times Magazine (published on January 22, 2006) Bulger accused Dubner and Levitt of "holding Stetson Kennedy responsible for the inadequacies of their own research":

In the same issue of the magazine, a letter of protest from famed oral historian Studs Terkel affirms that "With half a dozen Stetson Kennedys, we can transform our society into one of truth, grace and beauty.... The thing is, Stetson did what he set out to do .... He did get help. He should have been much more up-front. But he certainly doesn't deserve this treatment".

In his own response (published in the Jacksonville, Florida Folio Weekly, January 27, 2006) Kennedy pulled no punches:

In 2006, The Florida Times-Union, after extensive research, published an article "KKK Book Stands Up to Claim of Falsehood" substantiating the general accuracy of Kennedy's account of infiltrating the Klan, while acknowledging that (as he himself never denied) he had made use of dramatic effects and multiple narratives in the book I Rode with the Ku Klux Klan.

According to David Pilgrim, curator of the Jim Crow Museum at Ferris State University:

Later career
After World War II, Kennedy worked as a journalist for the liberal newspaper PM and as a part-time correspondent for publications such as the New York Post and The Nation. He also fed information about discrimination to columnist Drew Pearson. His stories appeared in newspapers and magazines such as the New York Post for which he was for a time Southern correspondent, and he fed information about discrimination to columnists. To bring the effects of Jim Crow in the South to public awareness, he authored a number of exposés of the Klan and the racist Jim Crow system over the course of his life, including Southern Exposure (1946), Jim Crow Guide to the USA (1959), and After Appomattox: How the South Won the War (1995). During the 1950s, Kennedy's books, considered too incendiary to be published in the US, were published in France by the existentialist philosopher Jean-Paul Sartre and subsequently translated into other languages. Kennedy coined the term "Frown Power", when he started a campaign with that name in the 1940s, which simply encouraged people to pointedly frown when they heard bigoted speech.

In 1952, when Kennedy ran for governor of Florida, his friend and houseguest Woody Guthrie wrote a set of lyrics for a campaign song, "Stetson Kennedy". The song was later set to music by Billy Bragg and recorded by Bragg and Jeff Tweedy's band Wilco on the album Mermaid Avenue Vol. II. Kennedy says he became "the most hated man in Florida", and his home at Fruit Cove near Lake Beluthahatchee  was firebombed by rightists  and many of his papers were destroyed, causing him to leave the country and go to live in France. There, in 1954, Kennedy wrote his sensational exposé of the workings of the Klan, I Rode With The Ku Klux Klan (later reissued as The Klan Unmasked), which was published by Jean-Paul Sartre. Questioned in later years about the accuracy of his account, Kennedy later said that he regretted not having included an explanatory introduction to the book about how the information in it was obtained. Bulger commented in a 2007 interview with The Associated Press, "Exposing their folklore – all their secret handshakes, passwords and how silly they were, dressing up in white sheets ... If they weren't so violent, they would be silly".

A founding member and past president of the Florida Folklore Society, Kennedy was a recipient of the 1998  Florida Folk Heritage Award and the Florida Governor's Heartland Award. His contribution to the preservation and propagation of folk culture is the subject of Peggy Bulger's dissertation, "Stetson Kennedy: Applied Folklore and Cultural Advocacy" (University of Pennsylvania, 1992). Kennedy is also featured as one of the "Whistle Blowers", in Studs Terkel's book Coming of Age, published in 1995.

In 2005, Jacksonville residents attended a banquet in honor of Kennedy's life, and afterward a slide show with narration at Henrietta's Restaurant, located at 9th and Main Street in Springfield.  This event was largely coordinated by Fresh Ministries. The slides included numerous pictures of his travels with author Zora Neale Hurston, and direct voice recordings which were later digitized for preservation.

In 2007 St. Johns County declared a "Stetson Kennedy Day".

Kennedy participated in the two-day "New Deal Resources: Preserving the Legacy" conference at the Library of Congress on the occasion of the 75th Anniversary of the New Deal held in March 2008. Kennedy's most recent book, Grits and Grunts: Folkloric Key West, was issued by the Pineapple Press, in 2008.

In February 2009, Kennedy bequeathed his personal library to the
Civic Media Center in Gainesville, Florida with which Kennedy had worked since the center's inception.

In October 2009, a first party for Kennedy's 93rd birthday was held at the Civic Media Center and the next day admirers flocked to Beluthahatchee Park, now a landmarked historic site, to celebrate Kennedy's birthday there.

Personal life
According to friends, he was married seven times, though Kennedy only admitted to five marriages, stating, "I'll leave it to the historians to decide how many times I've been married". His first marriage was in 1936 to Edith Ogden-Aguilar, a Cuban émigré he met in Key West, Florida while doing fieldwork for his own writing shortly after leaving UF.

In 1942, he had a son, Loren Stetson Kennedy, his only child.

After fleeing Budapest with his Hungarian wife during the Hungarian Revolution of 1956, Kennedy was held in detention in Paris for over a year after his passport was confiscated by the U.S. government due to McCarthyism.

In 2006, at 90 years old, Kennedy married writer and bookstore owner Sandra Parks, a former city commissioner of St. Augustine, Florida. They remained married until Kennedy died in 2011.

Legacy

Beluthahatchee Park
In 2003, Friends of Libraries USA put Beluthahatchee on its national register of literary sites and, to commemorate the occasion, Arlo Guthrie gave a concert in Jacksonville.

In 2005 Kennedy received a life estate on his 4-acre homestead in Saint Johns County, and it is now Beluthahatchee Park.

The name "Beluthahatchee" describes a mythical "Florida Shangri-la, where all unpleasantness is forgiven and forgotten" according to Zora Neale Hurston.

Among the amenities are a picnic pavilion, canoe dock, access to the Beluthatchee Lake, and use of the two wildlife observation platforms. A "Mother Earth Trail" throughout the property is planned, as envisioned by the Kennedy Foundation.  The Park's perimeter is surrounded by a heavy canopy of native vegetation and the enclave provides a habitat for wildlife and continues to serve as a rookery and roosting place for many types of waterfowl and other birds.

Kennedy's home has, upon his death, been opened as a museum and archive and offer educational exhibits, primarily about Woody Guthrie and William Bartram in addition to Kennedy himself, and has been operated by the Kennedy Foundation which shares office space in an adjacent home with the William Bartram Scenic and Historic Highway corridor group. A log cabin that's in the park may serve as a caretaker residence while the fourth building there may house an Artist-in-Residence through the Florida Folklife program.

The park is part of a 70-acre tract that Kennedy purchased in 1948, recorded restrictive covenants setting aside land in perpetuity as a wildlife refuge, and the following year subdivided, subsequently selling all but his own 4 acre parcel.

Death and memorials
 Kennedy died on August 27, 2011, at Baptist Medical Center South in Jacksonville, Florida, where he had been in palliative care for several days.

Kennedy's stated wishes were that upon his death a party should be held rather than a funeral; therefore, a celebration of Kennedy's life was held on October 1, 2011 (four days before Kennedy's 95th birthday) at Kennedy's homestead, Beluthahatchee Park. Several hundred relatives, friends, and admirers gathered for the events which commenced with an hour of musical performances. The performances included several pieces written by Kennedy's friend Woody Guthrie, who composed many songs at Beluthahatchee, including several about Kennedy, e.g., "Beluthahatchee Bill", culminating with all present singing Guthrie's "This Land Is Your Land". This was followed by an hour of eulogies.  Then all present walked down to Lake Beluthahatchee and viewed Kennedy's ashes being scattered thereon from a canoe.

Books
 Mister Homer, 1939
 Southern Exposure, University of Alabama Press 2011 reprint, 
 The Klan Unmasked, University of Alabama Press 2011 reprint: 
 Jim Crow Guide to the U.S.A., University of Alabama Press 2011 reprint: 
 Palmetto Country, 1942, University Press of Florida 1989 reprint: , Florida Historical Society Press 2009 reprint with a new publisher's preface, updated Afterward and eighty photographs  ; 
 The Jim Crow Guide: The Way It Was Before the Overcoming, 1956 at Paris, 1959, Florida Atlantic University 1990 reprint: 
 South Florida Folklife, 1994, (coauthors Peggy A. Bulger and Tina Bucuvalas), University Press of Mississippi, 
 After Appomattox: How the South Won the War, 1995, University Press of Florida 1996 reprint: 
 Grits and Grunts: Folkloric Key West, Pineapple Press, 2008
 The Florida Slave, The Florida Historical Society Press, September 29, 2011,

References

External links
 
 Stetson Kennedy Papers at Georgia State University
 Stetson Kennedy collection at the New York Public Library
 Interview with Stetson Kennedy, September 22, 1981, Florida Folklife Collection, State Library & Archives of Florida
 Oral History Interview with Stetson Kennedy, May 11, 1990, Oral Histories of the American South, University of North Carolina at Chapel Hill
Stetson Kennedy Letters, Bienes Museum of the Modern Book, Broward County Library.
 "Clan of the Fiery Cross", Parts 1–16, The Adventures of Superman, recordings of the Superman radio program from Archive.org
 "Know Your Enemy", This American Life, transcript of episode about Stetson Kennedy

1916 births
2011 deaths
20th-century American writers
21st-century American non-fiction writers
Activists for African-American civil rights
American environmentalists
American folklorists
American historians
American human rights activists
American investigative journalists
American memoirists
Robert E. Lee High School (Jacksonville) alumni
American newspaper journalists
American anti-fascists
American anti-racism activists
Ku Klux Klan in Georgia (U.S. state)
University of Florida alumni
Writers from Jacksonville, Florida
Victims of McCarthyism
Federal Writers' Project people